The Alaska Wildlife Conservation Center is a non-profit organization dedicated to conservation, research, education, and animal care. The center is in the Municipality of Anchorage on the approximant border of the Kenai Peninsula and the Kenai Mountains to the south and the Chugach Mountains to the north.

It is a Wildlife sanctuary for orphaned or injured wildlife, as well as home or temporary home to captive born and translocated wildlife such as wood bison. It is a wildlife sanctuary that provides comfortable, permanent homes for orphaned and injured animals.

History

Founded by Mike Miller, The Alaska Wildlife Conservation Center opened in 1993 as the for-profit Big Game Alaska."

In 1999, the center became a 501(c)3 non-profit organization, with Miller serving as the center's executive director. The name was officially changed to Alaska Wildlife Conservation Center, Inc. in 2007. In 2018, Miller departed the center as executive director, with Dianna Whitney being promoted to that position. In 2019, the center acquired the land and remaining assets from Miller.

Animals

Animals at the center include timber wolves, Grizzly bears, black bears, Alaskan moose, red foxes, elk, muskoxen, sitka black tailed deer, Porcupine caribou, Canadian lynxes, bald eagles, great horned owls, wood bison, and porcupines. This wildlife conservation center is also home to coyotes.

Most of the animals are cared for in large natural habitats. For instance, three brown bears live in an  habitat of brushland and conifers, and two black bears are housed in a  enclosure with a stream.

Education

The center offers educational programs and tours in self-guided, drive-through or walk-through formats.

Conservation

Starting in 2003, the center has taken part in a program to reintroduce the wood bison back into Alaska after a 100-year absence. The wood bison is the largest land mammal in North America, and is a keystone grazing herbivore from the region. Conservationists transferred thirteen wood bison from various Canadian wildernesses to this wildlife conservation center in 2006. They sent fifty-three more Canadian wood bison from Alberta's Elk Island National Park for their survival two years later. This project was a joint effort with the Alaska Department of Fish & Game and other conservation groups.

Media
Several documentaries, features films, and other video media have been shot on location at the Alaska Wildlife Conservation Center including a documentary for National Geographic and Into Alaska featuring Jeff Corwin in 2007, and Into the Wild, starring Emile Hirsch. Other special guests to the center include Jungle Jack Hanna who filmed a few segments for his syndicated program. The center, it's animals and staff have also been featured on many episodes of the NatGeo show Dr. Oakley, Yukon Vet.

In July 2010 the center's resident porcupine, "Snickers," gained worldwide publicity from video footage in which the friendly rodent appeared to behave like a puppy. The video went viral on the internet in a matter of days.

References

External links
 
 IUCN Bison Specialist Group Web site

1993 establishments in Alaska
Buildings and structures in Anchorage, Alaska
Nature conservation organizations based in the United States
Education in Anchorage, Alaska
Organizations based in Anchorage, Alaska
Roadside attractions in Alaska
Scientific organizations established in 1993
Tourist attractions in Anchorage, Alaska
Wildlife rehabilitation and conservation centers
Zoos in Alaska